The Women's 400 metres at the 2014 Commonwealth Games, as part of the athletics programme, took place at Hampden Park between 27 and 29 July 2014.

Results

Heats

The first round consisted of six heats, with qualification for the first three in each heat, and the six fastest losers overall. Botswana's Amantle Montsho was the fastest qualifier from the first round, at 51.88 seconds.

Heat 1

Heat 2

Heat 3

Heat 4

Heat 5

Heat 6

Semifinals

Semifinal 1

Semifinal 2

Semifinal 3

Final

References

Women's 400 metres
2014
2014 in women's athletics